Ingrid Woolard is dean  at Stellenbosch University's faculty of economic and management sciences and professor of economics at Stellenbosch University. She was a professor of economics at the University of Cape Town and a Research Associate of the Southern Africa Labour and Development Research Unit (SALDRU). Her research focuses primarily on Labour markets, social protection and assistance, poverty and inequality, tax policy, fiscal policy, unemployment, and survey methodology.

Education
Woolard read for a B.Sc. in Mathematical Statistics and Economics from the University of Natal (Durban, and BA (Hons) in Economics from UNISA, She then proceeded to the University of Cape Town where she obtained a PhD in Economics.

Career
Ingrid was previously the Chair of the Employment Conditions Commission which makes sectoral recommendations in sectors in which collective bargaining is weak (e.g. domestic work, farm work, hospitality and retail). She consults regularly for various South African government departments and international organizations such as the World Bank, the ILO and the OECD. Since 2007, Woolard has been one of the Principal Investigators in the long-running the National Income Dynamics Study (NIDS), South Africa's national household panel survey.

Woolard has been a member of the Davis Tax Committee since 2013.

Bibliography

Journal articles
Woolard has written dozens of peer-reviewed articles including:

 
 

Woolard has also written a book entitled:

Fighting Poverty: Labour Markets and Inequality in South Africa. This book was written in 2001 with the help of M. Leibbrant, H. Bhorat, M. Maziya, and S. van der Berg.

References

External links
 
 Profile on IDEAS/RePEc

Living people
20th-century South African economists
South African women economists
Labor economists
21st-century South African economists
Public economists
University of KwaZulu-Natal alumni
University of South Africa alumni
University of Cape Town alumni
Academic staff of Stellenbosch University
Academic staff of the University of Cape Town
1970 births